The local municipality is the lowest unit of local government in Quebec and is distinguished from the higher-level regional county municipality, or RCM, a municipal government at the supralocal level.

Eight municipalities are further subdivided into boroughs.

There are also eleven agglomerations grouping a number of municipalities and exercising some of the powers that would be exercised by a municipality elsewhere in Quebec.

With the exception of some Aboriginal communities, municipalities are governed by the Towns and Cities Act and the Municipal Code of Québec.

See also
List of municipalities in Quebec
List of communities in Quebec
Classification of municipalities in Quebec
Municipal history of Quebec
Municipal reorganization in Quebec
List of boroughs in Quebec
Administrative divisions of Quebec
Kativik Regional Government

References